Neue Luppe  is an artificial river of Saxony and Saxony-Anhalt, Germany.

It is a left tributary of the White Elster River, which it joins near Schkeuditz.

See also
List of rivers of Saxony
List of rivers of Saxony-Anhalt

References

Rivers of Saxony
Rivers of Saxony-Anhalt
Rivers of Germany